|}

The Navan Novice Hurdle is a Grade Two National Hunt hurdle race in Ireland. It is run in mid-December at Navan in Ireland, over a distance of about 2 miles and 4 furlongs (4,023 metres).  

The race was first run in 1999 over a distance of 2 miles, before being increased to its present distance in 2000. It was originally run as a Grade 3 race, before being given Grade 1 status in 2004. It was downgraded again from the 2014 running. The race is usually contested by some of the season's top novice hurdlers, who often go on to contest top races at both the Cheltenham Festival and the Punchestown Festival later in the season. Prior to 2010 it was run as the Barry & Sandra Kelly Memorial Novice Hurdle. A race with a similar title was run in 1998, but was not restricted to novices.

Records
Leading jockey (5 wins):
 Ruby Walsh - Boston Bob (2011), Pont Alexandre (2012), Briar Hill (2013), Bellshill  (2015), Easy Game (2018)

Leading trainer  (7 wins):
 Willie Mullins - Mikael D'Haguenet (2008), Boston Bob (2011), Pont Alexandre (2012), Briar Hill (2013), Bellshill  (2015), Next Destination (2017), Easy Game (2018)

Winners

See also
 Horse racing in Ireland
 List of Irish National Hunt races

References

 Racing Post:
, 

National Hunt races in Ireland
National Hunt hurdle races
Navan Racecourse